Severe Tire Damage is a primarily live album by They Might Be Giants, released in 1998.  It also features a few studio tracks, including a new single ("Doctor Worm").

The live cuts, some recorded at soundchecks without any audience, feature at least one track from every album since their debut, which include a few old fan favorites that have been reworked since the duo adopted a full backing band.  Songs like "She's an Angel", from their debut, They Might Be Giants, and "Birdhouse in Your Soul", from their major label debut, Flood, are treated to multiple guitars and a horn section. Conversely, the song "Meet James Ensor" originally appeared on their first full band effort, John Henry (1994) and surfaces here in a bare-bones rendition, with only vocals and an accordion.

Besides the aforementioned lack of an audience on several tracks, some tracks have also undergone studio "retooling" - most notably, "Ana Ng," which appeared in its untampered form (with an uncropped intro and without a heavily distorted voice saying, "I don't want the world...") on the 1994 promo-only release "Live!! New York City."

A condensed version of this album was released as Live, which featured 10 of the 24 tracks listed here.

Song notes
 Tracks 1, 2, and 17 were recorded in a studio rather than onstage; track 15 was recorded in a hotel room.
 Tracks 18-24 are hidden songs that were improvised in concert, based on the Planet of the Apes movie series. 
 "First Kiss" was later reworked and put on the 2001 album Mink Car as "Another First Kiss", with the same basic melody and similar lyrics but a substantially different style and tempo.
 Similarly, "They Got Lost" was later recorded in the studio at a slower tempo, and was released on Long Tall Weekend as well as later being the title track on the rarities compilation album They Got Lost.
 On Track 3, "They Get Lost", the band is introduced incorrectly as "They Must Be Giants", which is a tongue-in-cheek reference to an untitled, partial recording that appears as track 13 on both Don't Let's Start and its re-release Miscellaneous T. It was inadvertently left on the Dial-A-Song answering machine, in which a confused listener named Gloria talks to an unknown third party about the mystery of "There May Be Giants" and "There Must Be Giants", as she mistakenly refers to the band. It would later be referenced when Bryant Gumbel referred to them as "They Must Be Giants" when they performed "Your Racist Friend" on Today to promote the release of Flood.

Song origins
 Studio version of track 4 originally appeared on the Why Does The Sun Shine? (The Sun Is a Mass of Incandescent Gas) EP (1993)
 Studio versions of tracks 5, 8 and 12 originally appeared on Flood (1990)
 Studio version of track 6 originally appeared on They Might Be Giants (1986)
 Studio versions of tracks 7, 14 and 16 originally appeared on Factory Showroom (1996)
 Studio version of track 9 originally appeared on Lincoln (1988)
 Studio versions of tracks 11 and 13 originally appeared on Apollo 18 (1992)
 Studio version of track 15 originally appeared on John Henry (1994)

Track listing
All songs by They Might Be Giants unless otherwise noted. Tracks 18 - 24 are hidden tracks.

"Doctor Worm" – 3:01
"Severe Tire Damage Theme" – 0:40
"They Got Lost" – 3:42
"Why Does The Sun Shine? (The Sun is a Mass of Incandescent Gas)" (Hy Zaret)– 2:17
"Birdhouse in Your Soul" – 3:12
"She's An Angel" – 3:20
"XTC vs. Adam Ant" – 3:39
"Istanbul (Not Constantinople)" (Nat Simon/Jimmy Kennedy)– 3:07
"Ana Ng" – 3:00
"First Kiss" – 1:36
"Spider" – 0:53
"Particle Man" – 2:09
"She's Actual Size" – 2:18
"S-E-X-X-Y" – 3:06
"Meet James Ensor" – 1:30
"Till My Head Falls Off" – 2:54
"About Me" – 3:01 (actual track stops at 0:41 and is followed by 2:20 of silence)
"Planet of the Apes" - 2:35
"Return to the Planet of the Apes" – 2:46
"Conquest of the Planet of the Apes" – 1:40
"Escape from the Planet of the Apes" – 1:08
"Battle for the Planet of the Apes" – 1:57
"Beneath the Planet of the Apes" – 2:00
"This Ape's for You" – 1:13

References

External links
 Severe Tire Damage page at This Might Be A Wiki

They Might Be Giants live albums
1998 live albums
Restless Records live albums